Nagarle is a village in Mysore district of Karnataka state, India.

Location
Nagarle is located on the road from Nanjangud to T. Narasipur town.

Administration
Nagarle is part of Nanjangud taluk in Mysore district. The village is administrated by a Sarpanch (Head of Village) who is an elected representative.

Access
Nagarle village is 26 km from Mysore and 11 km from Nanjangud.  It is 149 km from Bangalore.

Demographics
The population of the village is 3,655 and there are a total of 870 families there. The literacy rate is 69%.

Villages and suburbs

 Hadinaru.4 km
 Hulimavu, 4 km
 Suthur, 4 km
 Horalavadi, 4 km
 Thumerale, 7 km

Post Office
There is a post office at Nagarle and the postal code is 571129.

Railway Station
The nearest railway stations are Chinnadagudihundi, Badanavalu and Nanjangud.

Education
 Government HP School, Nagarle

See also
 Jeemaralli
 Sutturu
Alambur
 Kahalli

References

Villages in Mysore district